Alfred Wekesa Sambu (1944) is a Kenyan politician. He belongs to the Orange Democratic Movement and was elected to represent the Webuye Constituency in the National Assembly of Kenya since the 2007 Kenyan parliamentary election.

He has a BSc degree in electrical engineering. He has been the board chairman of Kenya Power and Lighting Company.

He is the former chairman of AFC Leopards football club and Kenya Football Federation.

References

Living people
Kenyan Luhya people
1944 births
Orange Democratic Movement politicians
Members of the National Assembly (Kenya)